Ordu Province is a province of Turkey, located on the Black Sea coast. Its adjacent provinces are Samsun to the northwest, Tokat to the southwest, Sivas to the south, and Giresun to the east. Its license-plate code is 52.

The capital of the province is the city of Ordu.

Etymology
Ordu is the word for 'army' in current Turkish, originally meaning 'army camp', during the Ottoman Empire an army outpost was set up near the present day city. The city, and later the province, derived its name from this.

Geography

 

Ordu is a strip of Black Sea coast and the hills behind, historically an agricultural and fishing area and in recent years, tourism has seen an increase, mainly visitors from Russia and Georgia, as Ordu boasts some of the best beaches, rivers, and lush, green mountains on the Black Sea coast. Walking in the high pastures is now a popular excursion for Turkish holidaymakers. The higher altitudes are covered in forest.

Melet River, Bolaman River, Elekçi River, Turnasuyu Stream, Akçaova Stream and Civil Stream are the main rivers of the province. The topography of the province is not conducive to lake formation and only two major lakes, Gaga Lake and Ulugöl, are present in Ordu.

Economy
The economy of the province depends on agriculture. Ordu is famous for hazelnuts. Turkey as a whole produces about 70 percent of the world's hazelnuts, and Ordu is the chief producer in Turkey, responsible for 150,000–180,000 tonnes per year, which amounts to around 30% of Turkey's production. Hazelnuts production takes around 88% of Ordu's arable land, the remainder mainly consists of corn and wheat fields. Whilst covering only 0.1% of the arable land of the province, Ordu's kiwi production is the second largest in the country after Yalova. Beekeeping is also important in Ordu, which produced in 2010 12.8% of honey produced in Turkey.

Demographics
Mostly Chepni Turks and other Oghuz Turks live here and the province is home to a minority of Cheveneburi Georgians.

In recent decades many people from Ordu have migrated away to jobs in Istanbul, Bursa, Samsun, Sakarya or abroad.

Districts

Ordu province is divided into 19 districts (capital district in bold):

Places to see
Ordu has an attractive coast including pretty bays and the cleanest and longest beaches on this stretch of the Black Sea coast. Specific sites include:
Kurul Castle
Boztepe  – a 460 m hill above the city.
Karagöl – a crater lake at 3107 m, above the plateau of Çambaşı
Yason (Jason) point – a headland in Perşembe
Çambaşı Yaylası a high plateau

Well-known residents
 Fikri Sönmez – left-wing mayor of Fatsa in the period leading up to the 1980 Turkish coup d'état

References

External links

  Ordu governor's official website 
  Ordu municipality's official website
  Ordu weather forecast information 
  Ordum.com local information

 
Ordu Province
Chepni people